The men's shot put event  at the 2000 European Athletics Indoor Championships was held on February 26–27.

Medalists

Note: The original winner, Oleksandr Bagach, was later disqualified for doping.

Results

Qualification
Qualifying perf. 20.00 (Q) or 8 best performers (q) advanced to the Final.

Final

References
Results

Shot put at the European Athletics Indoor Championships
Shot